Frans Lourens Herman Rumpff,  (5 June 1912 – 4 April 1992) was the Chief Justice of South Africa from 1974 to 1982.

Early life and education 

Born in Standerton, Transvaal, Rumpff was educated at the University of Pretoria, where he obtained a BA (1933) and LLB (1935). From 1936 to 1938, he was employed by the Department of Justice and then he became clerk of Judge Maritz of the Transvaal Provincial Division.

Career 

In 1938, Rumpff decided to practice as an advocate and joined the Pretoria Bar and also taught part-time in private law at the University of Pretoria. He was appointed King's Counsel in 1951. He was appointed to the Transvaal Provincial Division of the Supreme Court of South Africa in 1951, and served on the court until 1961. He was the Judge President of the court from 1959 to 1961. In 1961, he was one of the judges who acquitted all the defendants in the Treason Trial.

In 1961, he was appointed to the Appellate Division of the Supreme Court of South Africa. He became Chief Justice of South Africa in 1974 in succession to Newton Ogilvie Thompson, and served in that position until his retirement in 1982.

See also

List of Judges President of the Gauteng Division of the High Court of South Africa

References 

1912 births
1992 deaths
People from Standerton
Afrikaner people
South African people of German descent
Chief justices of South Africa
South African Queen's Counsel
University of Pretoria alumni
South African judges